Joshua D. "Josh" Miller (born April 2, 1981) is an American politician serving as a member of the Arkansas House of Representatives for the 66th district. Elected in November 2012, he assumed office on January 14, 2013.

Early life and education 
Miller was born and raised in Heber Springs, Arkansas. He attended Arkansas Tech University and the University of Central Arkansas before earning an associate degree in political science from the Heber Springs campus of Arkansas State University-Beebe.

Career 
Miller worked as the head cook and bottle washer at MDM Investments. He later became a property investor and manager. Miller was elected to the Arkansas House of Representatives in November 2012 and assumed office on January 14, 2013.

Personal life 
Miller is married. Since suffering a spinal cord injury in 2003, he has used a motorized wheelchair.

References 

Living people
People from Heber Springs, Arkansas
Republican Party members of the Arkansas House of Representatives
American politicians with disabilities
1981 births